The Archdiocese of Kansas City in Kansas is a Latin Church ecclesiastical province or archdiocese of the Catholic Church in the United States of America.

The archbishop's episcopal seat is located at the Cathedral Church of Saint Peter in Kansas City, Kansas. The Archdiocese of Kansas City in Kansas is a metropolitan see. Its metropolitan archbishop oversees an ecclesiastical province with three suffragan dioceses: the Dioceses of Dodge City, Salina, and Wichita.

Territory
The Archdiocese comprises the following twenty-one counties of the U.S. state of Kansas:

 Anderson
 Atchison
 Brown
 Coffey
 Doniphan
 Douglas
 Franklin

 Jackson
 Jefferson
 Johnson
 Leavenworth
 Linn
 Lyon
 Marshall

 Miami
 Nemaha
 Osage
 Pottawatomie
 Shawnee
 Wabaunsee
 Wyandotte

History
The archdiocese was originally established as the Vicariate Apostolic of Indian Territory East of the Rocky Mountains on July 19, 1850, by Pope Pius IX.  It was composed of the present day states of Kansas, Nebraska, North and South Dakota, Colorado, Wyoming, and Montana. It lost territory and its name was changed to the Vicariate Apostolic of Kansas in 1857.  The vicariate was elevated to the Diocese of Leavenworth by Pope Leo XIII on May 22, 1877. It lost territory in 1887 when the dioceses of Concordia and Wichita were created, and in 1897 when several counties were moved to Concordia. The name of the diocese was changed to the Diocese of Kansas City in Kansas on May 10, 1947, by Pope Pius XII. All of these jurisdictions were in the Ecclesiastical Province of Saint Louis.

The Diocese of Kansas City in Kansas was elevated to an archdiocese by Pius XII on August 9, 1952.  The province encompasses the entire state of Kansas and has three suffragan sees, the dioceses of Dodge City, Salina (formerly Concordia) and Wichita.

Reports of sex abuse

In February 2019, it was announced that the Kansas Bureau of Investigation (KBI) had been investigating sex abuse allegations against the Archdiocese of Kansas City in Kansas and its suffragan Dioceses in the state of Kansas since November 2018. On August 14, 2020, Melissa Underwood, spokeswoman for the KBI, stated in an email “As of Aug. 7, we have had 205 reports of abuse and have opened 120 cases.”

Bishops

Apostolic Vicar of Indian Territory East of the Rocky Mountains
 John Baptiste Miège, S.J. (1850–1857), title changed with title of apostolic vicariate

Apostolic Vicars of Kansas
 John Baptiste Miège, S.J. (1857–1874) 
 Louis Mary Fink, O.S.B. (1874–1877), title changed with elevation to diocese

Bishops of Leavenworth
 Louis Mary Fink, O.S.B. (1877–1904) 
 Thomas Francis Lillis (1904–1910), appointed Coadjutor Bishop of Kansas City in Missouri and subsequently succeeded to that see
 John Chamberlain Ward (1910–1929) 
 Francis Johannes (1929–1937) 
 Paul Clarence Schulte  (1937–1946), appointed Archbishop of Indianapolis
 George Joseph Donnelly (1946–1947), title changed with title of diocese

Bishops of Kansas City in Kansas
 George Joseph Donnelly (1947–1950) 
 Edward Joseph Hunkeler (1951–1952), elevated to Archbishop

Archbishops of Kansas City in Kansas
 Edward Joseph Hunkeler (1952–1969) 
 Ignatius Jerome Strecker (1969–1993) 
 James Patrick Keleher (1993–2005) 
 Joseph Fred Naumann (2005–present)

Other priests of this diocese who became bishops
 James O'Reilly, appointed Bishop of Leavenworth in 1887 (because of his death, did not take effect)
 John Francis Cunningham, appointed Bishop of Concordia in 1898

High schools
 Bishop Miege High School, Roeland Park
 Bishop Ward High School, Kansas City
 Hayden High School, Topeka
 Immaculata High School, Leavenworth - Closed 2017
 Maur Hill – Mount Academy*, Atchison (until 2003, separate schools for boys (Maur Hill) and girls (Mount Academy))
 St. James Academy, Lenexa
 St. Thomas Aquinas High School, Overland Park
* Primary sponsorship comes from Saint Benedict's Abbey and Mount St. Scholastica Monastery.

See also

 Catholic Church by country
 Catholic Church hierarchy
 List of the Catholic dioceses of the United States

References

External links
Roman Catholic Archdiocese of Kansas City in Kansas Official Site

 
Roman Catholic Ecclesiastical Province of Kansas City
Kansas City in Kansas
Kansas City in Kansas
Kansas City in Kansas
1877 establishments in Kansas